A doge (plural dogi or doges) was an elected lord and head of state in several Italian city-states, notably Venice and Genoa, during the medieval and Renaissance periods. Such states are referred to as "crowned republics".

Etymology
The word is from the Venetian language, reaching English via French. However, the words duce and Duca are not interchangeable. Moreover, Duca (duke) is an aristocratic and hereditary title. The wife of a doge is styled a Dogaressa and the office of the doge is termed dogeship.

Usage

The title of doge was used for the elected chief of state in several Italian "crowned republics". The two best known such republics were Venice (where in Venetian he was called  ) and Genoa (where he was called a  ) which rivalled each other, and the other regional great powers, by building their historical city-states into maritime, commercial, and territorial empires. Other Italian republics to have doges were Amalfi and the small town of Senarica.

In several of his writings, Theodor Herzl, the founder of modern political Zionism, proposed that the future Jewish State take the title of "Dog" for its head of state – but this was not taken up by the actual state of Israel.

Selection
After 1172 the election of the Venetian doge was entrusted to a committee of forty, who were chosen by four men selected from the Great Council of Venice, which was itself nominated annually by 12 persons. After a deadlocked tie at the election of 1229, the number of electors was increased from forty to forty-one. New regulations for the elections of the doge introduced in 1268 remained in force until the end of the republic in 1797. Their object was to minimize as far as possible the influence of individual great families, and this was effected by complex elective machinery. Thirty members of the Great Council, chosen by lot, were reduced by lot to nine; the nine chose forty and the forty were reduced by lot to twelve, who chose twenty-five. The twenty-five were reduced by lot to nine and the nine elected forty-five. Then the forty-five were once more reduced by lot to eleven, and the eleven finally chose the forty-one who elected the doge. None could be elected but by at least twenty-five votes out of forty-one, nine votes out of eleven or twelve, or seven votes out of nine electors.

Initially, the doge of Genoa was elected without restriction and by popular suffrage.

Term of office and restrictions of power
In Venice, doges normally ruled for life, although a few were forcibly removed from office. While doges had great temporal power at first, after 1268, the doge was constantly under strict surveillance: he had to wait for other officials to be present before opening dispatches from foreign powers; he was not allowed to possess any property in a foreign land. After a doge's death, a commission of  passed judgment upon his acts, and his estate was liable to be fined for any discovered malfeasance. The official income of the doge was never large, and from early times holders of the office remained engaged in trading ventures.

Originally, Genoese doges held office for life in the so-called "perpetual dogeship"; but after the reform effected by Andrea Doria in 1528 the term of his office was reduced to two years.

Gallery

See also
 Doge of Amalfi

References

 Heads of state
 Noble titles
Titles of national or ethnic leadership
Republic of Venice
History of Genoa